James William Whitworth (16 January 1898 – fl.1989) was a British trade union leader and politician.

Whitworth was educated at St Stephen's School in Audenshaw, and then the local college of technology.  He became a cotton spinner, and in 1926 he was appointed as secretary of the Ashton-under-Lyne Operative Cotton Spinners' and Twiners' Association.

Whitworth was a supporter of the Labour Party, and in 1934 he was elected to the Ashton-under-Lyne council.  In 1946, he became an alderman on the council, which he remained until it was abolished in 1974, and he served as Mayor of Ashton from 1947 to 1949.  From 1939 to 1942, he also served on the National Executive Committee of the Labour Party.

The Ashton-under-Lyne Spinners were affiliated to the Amalgamated Association of Operative Cotton Spinners, and Whitworth was elected as its vice-president, then in 1953 as its president.  In 1960, he instead became its full-time general secretary.  During this period, he served on the Cotton Board, and was prominent on the council of the United Textile Factory Workers' Association, serving for a period as its treasurer.  In 1965, Whitworth stood down as general secretary to become chair of the General Federation of Trade Unions, ending his term the following year.

Whitworth was made a Commander of the Order of the British Empire, a Deputy-Lieutenant of Lancashire, and a freeman of Ashton-under-Lyne.

References

1898 births
Year of death missing
General Secretaries of the Amalgamated Association of Operative Cotton Spinners
Labour Party (UK) councillors
Mayors of places in Greater Manchester
People from Ashton-under-Lyne
Presidents of the Amalgamated Association of Operative Cotton Spinners
Presidents of the General Federation of Trade Unions (UK)